Angry Birds Friends (formerly Angry Birds Facebook) is a puzzle video game and the fourth game in the Angry Birds series. It is developed and published by Rovio Entertainment.

The game was originally an exclusive Facebook game called Angry Birds Facebook that was released on February 13, 2012, and was renamed to the current name on May 23, 2012. The Facebook version introduced power-ups to the Angry Birds game series. Android and iOS versions were released on May 2, 2013. On October 27, 2014, Rovio introduced a global league to allow users from around the world to play against each other.

Gameplay

The mobile version has six-level tournaments that change twice a week, but there are no episodes like other games or the Facebook version. Unlike the previous Angry Birds games, this game syncs progress with the Facebook version's weekly tournaments between the player, placeholder scores represented by Red and Chuck, and any of the player's Facebook friends who also play the game. The game requires a login to Facebook to sync progress; otherwise one can play without a Facebook account. The top 3 winners each week earn in-game currency, called Bird Coins, which can be used to purchase power-ups or to acquire additional bird slingers. In addition, the mobile version includes four power-up practice levels where there are infinite power-ups available for use.

In February 2012, the episode "Surf and Turf" was added to the Angry Birds Friends Facebook version and it was also added to the original Angry Birds. In July 2012, the episode "Pigini Beach" was added to the Angry Birds Friends Facebook version.

In August 2012, Rovio announced a partnership with the punk band Green Day, which led to 20 new levels of Angry Birds Friends on Facebook featuring all three members of the band. The new levels showcased each member of Green Day as a green, bad pig and also featured Green Day's latest single, and an exclusive track. The levels were removed in December 2012.

In March 2013, Rovio added the episode named "Pig Tales", which has fantasy-themed levels, for the Facebook version that features an all-new power-up and a mushroom hat that can be used in the in-game avatars.

The game's weekly tournaments sometimes feature levels based on the season, such as Christmas themed levels in December and Easter themed levels during Easter. These usually include a special gimmick to make them unique, like 2012 and 2013 Halloween introducing zombie pigs, which spawn an extra pig to kill when a new one’s killed.

In March 2016, Angry Birds Friends had a special theme "Year In Space" to commemorate the return of the American astronaut Scott Kelly and a cosmonaut after spending one year on the International Space Station.

In 2017, all birds and pigs designs changed (except Bubbles).

Reception

The game has received mixed reviews with a Metacritic score of 65/100 based on 5 reviews. Pocket Gamer criticized the game for being "shallow and uninspiring"

In April 2013, Rovio revealed that the Facebook game had been installed by over 60 million users, with 1.2 million daily active users and 10 million monthly active users.

References

External links

Angry Birds Friends On Rovio Website

2012 video games
Android (operating system) games
Friends
Facebook games
IOS games
Puzzle video games
Video games developed in Finland
Rovio Entertainment games